The Greenbelt Lines designated as the Greenbelt–New Carrollton Line on Route G12, and Greenbelt Road-Good Luck Road Line on Route G14, are daily bus routes operated by the Washington Metropolitan Area Transit Authority between Greenbelt station of the  Green, and Yellow Lines of Washington Metro and New Carrollton station of the Orange Line of the Washington Metro. The lines operate every 30 minutes during peak hours and 60 minutes all other times. Both Route G12 and G14 trips are roughly 55 minutes long. Both routes provide service between New Carrollton and Greenbelt connecting travelers to both communities without having to enter Washington, D.C. by train.

Route description and service

Routes G12 and G14 operates daily between Greenbelt station and New Carrollton station. The route operates between 5:00 am and 11:48 pm on weekdays and between 6:30 am and 10:00 pm on the weekends. The first three eastbound trips begin at Greenbelt Center during the weekdays before 6:00 am while trips after 11:00 pm begin/end at Greenbelt Center. Route G14 trips skip the Beltway Plaza Mall loop on weekdays only before 7:45 am. Routes G12 and G14 operate every 30 minutes during rush hours and 60 minutes all other times, with a frequency of 15 minutes during rush hours and 30 minutes all other times.

Route G12 begins at Greenbelt station and follow Greenbelt Metro Drive before turning left along the Cherrywood Lane roundabout. The route then turns on Ivy Lane from Cherrywood Lane, then turns right along Kenilworth Avenue, then has left turns along Crescent Road and Ridge Road. The line then turns on back on Ivy Lane, left on Lastner Lane, then back onto Ridge Road. The line then continues along Ridge Road until it turns onto Gardenway, then another turn onto Crescent Road serving Roosevelt Center/Old Greenbelt meeting up with the G14. Then the route turns along Southway, and then turns right along Ridge Road again. The route then turns onto Westway, then Lakeside Drive, and Lakecrest Drive before turning left along Greenbelt Road to serve the Greenway Shopping Center which meets the G14 again.

Route G12 then turns left along Hanover Parkway while serving stops along Hanover Parkway, Mandan Road, and Ora Glen Drive before resuming service along Hanover Parkway. The route diverts onto Good Luck Road to loop and serve Doctor's Community Hospital before resuming its routing along Princess Garden Parkway until it reaches Annapolis Road. Route G12 will operate along Annapolis Road before turning onto Harkins Road, then onto Ellin Road to reach its terminus at New Carrollton station. The line will follow the same routing vice versa except westbound trips will operate along Annapolis Road and Lanham Severn Road in order to reach Princess Garden Parkway.

Route G14 begins at Greenbelt station and follow Greenbelt Metro Drive before turning right along the Cherrywood Lane roundabout. The line then operates along Cherrywood Lane before turning along Greenbelt Road. The route then turns and loops into Beltway Plaza before resuming along Greenbelt Road. Select trips before 7:45 am will skip Beltway Plaza. The route continues along Greenbelt Road before it turns along Lakecrest Drive. The route will then operate along Lakecrest Drive, Lakeside Drive, Westway, and Ridge Road. The route then turns along Gardenway and Crescent Road serving Roosevelt Center/Old Greenbelt meeting up with the G12. The route then turns along Southway and remains straight instead of turning onto Ridge Road with the G12. The G14 remains along Southway before turning on Greenbelt Road serving Greenway Shopping Center which meets the G12 again.

The G14 then remains along Greenbelt Road until turning along Mission Drive serving Goddard Corporate Park. The line then resume service along Greenbelt Road, then turns along Good Luck Road remaining straight until turning left on Cipriano Road. It then remains along Cipriano Road before turning right along Lanham Severn Road. Route G14 will then follow the G12's routing to New Carrollton. The line will follow the same routing vice versa.

Routes G12 and G14 currently operate out of Landover division.

G12 stops

G14 stops

History
The Greenbelt–New Carrollton Line was run by two different Metrobus routes from 1978 until 1993. The local routes were operated by routes T15, T16, and T17 from 1976 until 2010 while the Express routes were operated by the "Greenbelt-New Carrollton Express Line" operated by routes R11 and R15. After 1993, the line was solely operated by routes T15, T16, and T17. After the mid 2000s, routes T16 and T17 continued.

R11, R15

Routes R11 and R15 operated express routes during peak hours only between 1978 and 1993. Both routes operated during rush hours only.

Greenbelt–New Carrollton Express Line

Routes R11 and R15 originally began as Street Car Lines operating between Farragut Square and Springhill Lake Apartment Complex when they were a part of the Kenilworth Avenue Line. In 1973, both routes R11 and R15 became Metrobus routes along with routes R12, R13, and R14. On July 18, 1977, routes R11 and R15 were shorten to Stadium–Armory station. Early morning Saturday service was discontinued on September 26, 1977 being replaced with the Orange and Blue Lines with peak hour trips not being affected.

On December 3, 1978, routes R11 and R15 were separated from the Kenilworth Avenue Line and were created as the "Greenbelt-New Carrollton Express Line" which would provide express service between Greenbelt and New Carrollton station. Route R11 would operate between Beltway Plaza Mall and New Carrollton station while route R15 would operate between Greenbelt Center and New Carrollton station. Both routes would primarily run along Greenbelt Road, Cherrywood Lane, Kenilworth Avenue, the Capital Beltway, and John Hanson Highway.

On December 11, 1993, routes R11 and R15 were discontinued when the Green Line portion between Greenbelt station and Fort Totten station opened and replaced by routes R12, T15, T16, and T17.

T15, T16, T17
Route T16 originally operated as part of the Bowie-Belair Line with route T14 in the 1980s.

Routes T15, T16 and T17 were the original Greenbelt–New Carrollton Line which was known as the Greenbelt Line before the G12, G13, G14, and G16. The T16 ran Mondays and Saturdays while the T17 only had rush-hour service. Both buses ran at different times and the T15 and T17 only served Goddard Corporate Park. Route T15 would also loop around Edmonston Road, Cherrywood Lane, and Ivy Lane serving Greenbelt Marriott. All routes operated on 60 minute headways with routes T15 and T17 operating at a combined 30 minute frequency.

History
Routes T16 and T17 originally operated all the way between Rhode Island Avenue–Brentwood station and Beltway Plaza Mall, via New Carrollton and Capital Plaza Mall, between March 27, 1976 and December 3, 1978 when both routes were truncated to only operate between Beltway Plaza and New Carrollton station. Route T15 originally operated as the Bowie–Belair Shuttle before being replaced by route T12 on December 3, 1978. Routes T15 also originally served Crofton until being replaced by the B29 and B31 around the early 1990s.

On December 11, 1993, routes T16, and T17 were extended from Beltway Plaza Mall to Greenbelt station in order to provide Greenbelt residents access to the Washington Metro. T15 also joined the T16 and T17 on December 11, 1993 when Greenbelt station opened and only operated during weekday peak hours via Cherrywood Lane and Ivy Lane.

On June 30, 2002, routes T15, T16, and T17 routing were changed where buses will operate via Soil Conservation Road to the NASA visitors center outside the security fence at Goddard Space Flight Center with customers can get off the bus at new bus stops along Greenbelt Road near the main gate. On weekends, buses will bypass the center.

On September 29, 2002, route T15 was discontinued and replaced by routes R12, T16, and T17 since almost all of its routing overlapped the three routes between Greenbelt and New Carrollton station. Route T17 began operating every 30 minutes to fulfill T15 service. Routes T16 and T17 were also rerouted inside Goddard Space Flight Center to no longer operate along Explorer Road and Goddard Road and instead operate via Icesat Road and the visitor center only.

On March 27, 2005, service to Goddard Space Flight Center visitors center resumed on Saturdays as the visitors center reopened on Saturday. The route previously only served the loop on weekdays only.

Restructuring service in Greenbelt

Bus service in Greenbelt, Maryland was controversial over the years due to lack of services and long routes. Proposal were mentioned as part of Metro's systemwide bus and rail cuts proposed during a budget crisis in spring of 2010. The Metro Board then took all service cuts off the table before approving the budget for that fiscal year. Alterations to Greenbelt's bus service came back up at the request of Greenbelt and Prince George's County.

The Greenbelt City Council supported the changes mainly because they feared that if changes were not made, Greenbelt would be at the top of the list for service reductions during the next budget cycle. WMATA staff wanted to reconstructive the routes because they felt that resources could be used more efficiently. WMATA estimates that proposed changes will save about $563,000 per year in operating costs. At the time of the announcement, only the 81 (on Sundays only), R3, C2, R12, and the T16 and T17 were running into Greenbelt along with TheBus 11, 15, 15X, and 16. The C2, R12, T16, and T17 and TheBus routes were the only routes that operates into Greenbelt as the 81, and R3 only operated to Greenbelt station.

Routes T16 and T17 ran very long routes as all the landmarks were combined into one long route and the T17 was only rerouted to service Goddard Corporate Park during peak hours. This meant inconsistent scheduling to the T16 and T17 around its path. T16 operates Monday through Saturday up until 9:00 PM with no peak-hour service. Route T17 also only operates during the weekday peak-hours. Route R12 was an extremely long route experiencing bus bunching and scheduling problems and route C2 had to backtrack to serve Greenbelt station. There is no Sunday service on any route at the time except route 81 which only operates to Greenbelt station and heads to Cherry Hill or Rhode Island Avenue–Brentwood station and route R3 was shorten to operate between Fort Totten station and Prince George's Plaza station on weekends only having no Greenbelt service during those times.

April 2010 proposals
In April 2010, proposals were set for brand new routes T12 and T14 to join the T16 and eliminate the T17. It sets as the following:
 Route T12 would operate on a combination of the C2 and R12 routing as both routes were proposed to be shorten to terminate at Greenbelt station. The T12 would operate between Greenbelt and New Carrollton station but would not enter the Beltway Plaza Mall loop. The route would also turn on Handover Parkway and serve Doctor's Community Hospital. 
 Route T14 would operate between Beltway Plaza and Goddard Corporate Park only via Greenbelt station, Franklin Park, and Old Greenbelt replacing route R12 routing in Greenbelt and completely replacing route T17. The route would also turn on Greenbelt and Handover Parkway and run along Ora Glen Drive. It'll be the only service to operate the Beltway Plaza loop. However the Goddard Space Flight Center visitors center loop will be eliminated.
 Route T16 would operate via the C2 routing between Greenbelt station and Greenbelt Center, and then the current routing between Greenbelt Center and New Carrollton station but will discontinue service to Doctors Community Hospital being replaced by the T12, and having Old Greenbelt and Beltway Plaza service replaced by route T14. However the Goddard Space Flight Center visitors center loop.
 Route T17 would be eliminated and replaced by a combination of routes T12, T14, and T16.

This would lead to the following reductions of services on already running routes:
 Route C2 would end at Greenbelt station discontinuing service between Greenbelt station to Greenbelt Center. This would eliminate direct service to University of Maryland and Wheaton station in Old Greenbelt and Greenbelt Center.
 Route R3 would be discontinued completely and be replaced by a combination of routes C2, F6, R2.
 Route R12 would also end at Greenbelt with service discontinuing to New Carrollton. This would eliminate direct service to New Carrollton along the R12 routing in Old Greenbelt as the proposed T14 would end at Goddard Corporate Park only.

May 2010 proposals
On May 8, 2010, WMATA released another proposal for simplified Greenbelt service which includes brand new routes G12, G14, and G16 instead of routes T12, T14, and T16. It was set as the following:
 Route G12 would operate along route R12's service along the Old Greenbelt neighborhood with a reroute along Lastner Lane and Ridge Road instead of operating along Crescent Road, Hillside Road, and Laurel Hill Road and an option for the route to remain on the R12 and T16 regular routing. The G12 would also have service through the University Square apartments off Westway. It would also turn along Greenbelt and Mandan Road and run along Ora Glen Drive replacing route R12 service and would also serve Doctor's Community Hospital. The route would be a similar route to route T14 but would instead operate between Greenbelt station and New Carrollton station instead of Beltway Plaza and Goddard Corporate Park via Greenbelt. Parts along Crescent Road, Hillside Road, and Laurel Hill Road would be replaced by a rerouted TheBus Route 11.
 Route G14 would operate along a combination of routes C2, R12, T16, and T17 operating on route C2's routing between Greenbelt station and Greenbelt Center via Franklin Park, and routes T16 and T17 routing between Greenbelt Center and New Carrollton station. It would be the only route to operate via Goddard Corporate Park and would only operate weekdays only until 6:00 pm. However the Goddard Space Flight Center visitors center loop, service along Kenilworth Avenue, Old Greenbelt service, and service to Doctor's Community Hospital will be eliminated.
 Route G16 would operate the same pathway as route G14 but would skip Goddard Corporate Park and operate during late nights after 6:00 pm and Saturday only. 
 Route C2 would still end at Greenbelt station discontinuing service to Greenbelt Center.
 Route R3 was removed from the proposals and would not be discontinued.
 Route R12 would discontinue service along Frankin Park being replaced by routes G14 and G16.

September 2010 proposals
In September 2010, WMATA released the final proposal for future Greenbelt service along with Prince Georges County TheBus in October 2010. The WMATA changes were similar to the May 8 proposal but with some changes.
 Route G12 would be rerouted along Lastner Lane and Ridge Road, and would operate along Lakecrest Drive, Westway and Lakeside Drive similar to route G14 and G16 but going the opposite direction (which means stops route G14 go along that goes towards New Carrollton station would instead operate to Greenbelt station for route G12 and vice versa) and turn onto Greenbelt and Lakecrest Drive. It would also instead serve route T16 and T17 route along Handover Parkway and Mandan Road plus run along Ora Glen Drive. Service along Southway would be run by routes G14 and G16. Service along Crescent Road, Hillside Road, and Laurel Hill Road would be replaced by a rerouted TheBus Route 11.
 Routes G14 and G16 would remain along Greenbelt Road and not run along Handover Parkway and Mandan Road with that part being run by route G12. Routes G14 and G16 would also not serve Franklin Park with route R12 running along it instead. But the G14 and G16 would serve the Beltway Plaza Mall loop.
 A new "Time Transfer" were to be added at Greenbelt Center for routes G12, G14, and G16.
 Route R12 would serve Frankin Park and the Beltway Plaza loop.
 Route C2 would still end at Greenbelt station discontinuing service to Greenbelt Center.
 TheBus route 11 would be extended into the Old Greenbelt Neighborhood running on the former route R12, T16, and T17 routes and operate as a loop. 
 TheBus Route 15 would be eliminated and replaced with a combinations of routes G14, G16, TheBus and routes 11 and 16.

The Metro Board was to vote on the changes on September 30, 2010. If the vote gets approved, the changes will begin as early as December.

Restructuring
In late 2010 in part of a reconstructing attempt, WMATA announced changes to bus lines in Greenbelt that will affect the current route T16 and T17 along with routes C2, and R12 beginning on December 19, 2010.

Routes T16 and T17 were eliminated and replaced by routes G12, G13, G14, and G16 being renamed to the Greenbelt–New Carrollton Line. Routes G13, G14, and G16 would replace routes C2, T16 and T17 while route G12 would replace route R12's routing between Greenbelt and New Carrollton stations. While both routes T16 and T17 served Doctors Community Hospital, routes G13, G14, and G16 would not serve the hospital as route G12 will serve the hospital instead as the route was more closer to the hospital than the G13, G14, and G16. Also, routes G13 and G14 would serve Goddard Corporate Park on weekdays at all times while route G16 would not serve the park. The new Greenbelt Line would be the same proposal from the September 2010 proposal.

Route G12 would run between Monday and Saturday (the same as the T16), the G13 was a morning rush-hour service only that doesn't serve Beltway Plaza Mall and has the same routing as the G14, the G14 only ran Monday and Friday from 8:00 AM to 6:00 PM running via Goddard Corporate Park, and the G16 ran Weekday late nights after 6:00 PM and Saturday service only skipping Goddard Corporate Park. Most of the former C2, R12, T16, T17 routing was absorbed into the new G12, G13, G14, and G16.

A new "Timed transfer" was also introduced with the G12, G13, G14, and G16 routing. Buses will be scheduled to meet each other at Old Greenbelt. It works as an eastbound/westbound bus on one route arrives at the same time as an eastbound/westbound bus on the other route. Buses will have a scheduled wait of about 5 minutes to allow for the vagaries of traffic. For example, someone in the northern part of Old Greenbelt (the G12) will be able to reach Goddard Corporate Park (G13/G14) by transferring at Greenbelt Center. Similarly, someone at Beltway Plaza (G13/G14/16) can reach Roosevelt High or Doctors Community Hospital (G12) the same way.

Route C2 was cutback to end at Greenbelt station with service between the station and Greenbelt Center being replaced by routes G13, G14, and G16. Route R12 was split into two routes. The R12 portion between Greenbelt and New Carrollton station was replaced by the G12 while diverting into Doctors Community Hospital and operating along Ridge Road, Ivy Lane, and Lastner Lane. TheBus route 11 replaced parts of the T16, T17, and R12 along Hillside Road, Laurel Hill Road, and the portion of Crescent Road between Hillside Road and Lastner Lane which was extended as a loop running from Greenbelt station and a loop along Handover Parkway Mandan Road and Ora Glen Drive in the Westbound Direction. TheBus route 15 was also discontinued and replaced by routes G12, G13, G14, G16 and TheBus routes 11, and 16.

All changes went into effect on December 19, 2010 with service beginning the next day as there was no Sunday service on any route at the time.

On June 26, 2011, routes G13 and G14 were rerouted in Goddard Corporate Park to operates along Forbes Boulevard and Aerospace Road then return to Greenbelt Road due to provide service closer to an office building at 7700 Hubble Drive housing for NASA and NOAA employees.

During WMATA's FY2016 budget, WMATA proposed to eliminate routes G13 and G16 and replace them with route G14. All G13 and G16 trips will be renamed route G14. Service along Aerospace Road and Forbes Boulevard would be discontinued due to low ridership for route G14. Also, new Sunday service will be added to both G12 and G14. The reasons for the proposed changes was simplify the Greenbelt–New Carrollton Line, very few people use stops on Aerospace Road, extending all G16 trips to Goddard Corporate Park will provide better service to the apartments on the south side of Greenbelt Road (east of Good Luck Road) and to Eastgate Shopping Center and the route has many riders during the week and Saturday which should have Sunday service under WMATA standards. Service to Goddard Corporate Park would become more frequent and would be daily instead of having a reduced service during the week.

On March 27, 2016, routes G13 and G16 were discontinued by WMATA and replaced by the G14 which added weekend service. The G14 would absorb the G13's Beltway Plaza Mall skip in the morning before 7:30 AM and serve Goddard Corporate Park at all times. Route G14 would also discontinue service along Forbes Boulevard and Aerospace Road due to low ridership. Also, the G12 and G14 added Sunday service for the first time which was not available to the T16 and T17. With the G14 adding full daily service, this also added additional service after 6:00 pm on weekdays and weekend service for residents in Goddard Corporate Park on the former T17 routing.

In 2017, WMATA proposed to revise the G12 and G14 schedule which would eliminate the Time Transfer at Roosevelt Center. The G12 and G14 are scheduled to depart from both Greenbelt and New Carrollton within a few minutes of each other and are timed to meet at Roosevelt Center. WMATA proposed to stagger the departure times because staggering departures at the stations could provide more departure options to customers travelling to and from stops served by both routes, including at Roosevelt Center in Greenbelt, improving the combined frequency of service from approximately every 30 and 60 minutes to every 15 and 30 minutes at stops served by both routes G12 and G14 and would improve service operations and reduce bus congestion at the New Carrollton, where routes G12 and G14 share a bus bay according to WMATA. An example of the proposed scenario goes as follows:

Performance measures according to WMATA go as the following as of the FY2016 budget:

On June 24, 2018, the "Timed Transfer" at Greenbelt Center was discontinued by WMATA in order to improve the combined service frequency for customers on both routes. The G12 and G14 now run 15 minutes apart during peak hours and 30 minutes during other times.

During the COVID-19 pandemic, routes G12 and G14 operated on its weekend schedule beginning on March 16, 2020. However, the G12 and G14 were suspended during the weekends. Full weekday service and Saturday service resumed on August 23, 2020 but with Sunday service now only operating between 8:00 AM to 8:00 PM.

On June 6, 2021, the routes were split into two separate lines, with the route G12 remaining the Greenbelt-New Carrollton Line and the route G14 being renamed the Greenbelt Road-Good Luck Road Line, trip times and routing remain the same on both routes.

On September 5, 2021, full Sunday service was restored on both routes.

In August 2022, G12 service temporarily bypasses Doctors Community Hospital due to a safety concern. It resumed service on September 14, detouring on Mallery Drive in the process.

References

G12
Transportation in Prince George's County, Maryland